The Pungo River is a river in eastern North Carolina, United States.  It originally began in the Great Dismal Swamp in Washington County, North Carolina; the upper part of the river has since been supplanted by the Pungo River Canal, dug in the 1950s to improve drainage of local farmland.  The river flows southeast and forms part of the boundary between Beaufort County and Hyde County.  The river then widens dramatically, turns west, and flows past Belhaven, North Carolina before joining the Pamlico River near Pamlico Sound.

A 21-mile (33.8 km) canal connects the Pungo River with the Alligator River to its east.

See also 
 Pungo, Virginia

External links 
  Pungo River, Trails.com
  Belhaven, North Carolina official site
  Pungo River paddle trail map, North Carolina State University

Rivers of North Carolina
Rivers of Beaufort County, North Carolina
Rivers of Washington County, North Carolina
Tributaries of Pamlico Sound